Luces en el Mar (also known as Luces Del Mar) is a small town in the Mexican state of Guerrero, approximately 5.5 miles north-west of Acapulco. It is the location of a military base of the Mexican Air Force situated on a long stretch of land bordered by rough seas on one side and a very calm lagoon on the other. Waterskiing can be done in the lagoon, as can trips to see the island, Isla Montosa. On the lagoon side, one can find crocodiles in which the gentleman that once lived there caught (Don Pio). The beach's somewhat rougher waves and remote location away from the tourist center of Acapulco account for its lack of popularity among tourists. But, the "closer-to-nature" atmosphere and romantic sunsets are a reward for those that venture there.

Populated places in Guerrero